"Murda" is a song recorded by American DJ and music producer Candyland. The song was released as Candyland's third single as a solo act on 19 May 2015. Although, the song was premiered exclusively by Billboard, one day prior.

Critical reception 

"Murda" gained generally positive reviews.
Amanda Mesa of Dancing Astronaut complemented the song's "shock value," and stated that the track brought "more than a good dose of intensity." Your EDM's Matthew Meadow also viewed the song positively, calling it, "simultaneously infectious." Meadow later on, claimed that the song would be likely to induce "everyone in the audience to make their best thizz face," as he culminated his review of the song.

Track listing

References

External links 

2015 singles
2015 songs
Candyland (musician) songs